{{DISPLAYTITLE:C23H29FN2O}}
The molecular formula C23H29FN2O may refer to:

 4-Fluorobutyrfentanyl, opioid analgesic and analog of butyrfentanyl; has been sold online as a designer drug
 4-Fluoroisobutyrfentanyl, opioid analgesic, analog of butyrfentanyl, and structural isomer of 4-Fluorobutyrfentanyl; has been sold online as a designer drug